Zherdevka is a town and the administrative center of Zherdevsky District in Tambov Oblast, Russia, located on the Savala River (Khopyor's tributary),  south of Tambov, the administrative center of the oblast. Population:

History
It was founded in 1954 after the merger of Zherdevka railway station (opened in 1869), a settlement near a sugar factory (built in 1937), and a settlement of Chibizovka.

Administrative and municipal status
Within the framework of administrative divisions, Zherdevka serves as the administrative center of Zherdevsky District. As an administrative division, it is incorporated within Zherdevsky District as the town of district significance of Zherdevka. As a municipal division, the town of district significance of Zherdevka is incorporated within Zherdevsky Municipal District as Zherdevka Urban Settlement.

Military
The town was home to Zherdevka air base.

References

Notes

Sources

External links

Official website of Zherdevka 
Zherdevka Business Directory 

Cities and towns in Tambov Oblast